The 2017 Vuelta a España is the 72nd edition of the race. It was the last of cycling's three Grand Tours to take place during the 2017 road cycling season. The race started in Nîmes, France on 19 August and finished in Madrid on 10 September. All 18 UCI World Tour teams were automatically entitled to start the race.

Teams

The 18 UCI WorldTeams were automatically invited to participate in the Vuelta. In addition, the race organisers, invited four wildcard teams. These included , the only Spanish-registered UCI Professional Continental team. Also invited were the French team , Irish team  and Colombian team .

UCI WorldTeams

  (riders)
  (riders)
  (riders)
  (riders)
  (riders)
  (riders)
  (riders)
  (riders)
  (riders)
  (riders)
  (riders)
  (riders)
  (riders)
  (riders)
  (riders)
  (riders)
  (riders)
  (riders)

UCI Professional Continental teams

  (riders)
  (riders)
  (riders)
  (riders)

Cyclists

By starting number 
The following teams and cyclists took part in the 2017 Vuelta a España:

By team

By nationality 
The 198 riders that are competing in the 2017 Vuelta a España originated from 33 different countries.

References

External links
 

2017 Vuelta a España
2017